Mormo  is a genus of moths of the family Noctuidae.

Species
 Mormo cyanea Sugi, 1982
 Mormo maura – Old Lady, Black Underwing
 Mormo muscivirens Butler, 1878
 Mormo nyctichroa (Hampson, 1908)
 Mormo olivescaria (Swinhoe, 1897)
 Mormo phaeochroa (Hampson, 1908)
 Mormo venata (Hampson, 1908)

References
Natural History Museum Lepidoptera genus database
Mormo at funet

Hadeninae